Alons is a surname. Notable people with the surname include:

 Dwayne Alons (1946–2014), American politician who served in the Iowa House of Representatives
 Kevin Alons, American politician elected to the Iowa Senate, son of Dwayne

See also
 Alon (name)